Yasemin Şahin (born June 25, 1988, in Ankara, Turkey) is a Turkish handballer playing in left wing position.

Sports career

Club
Yasemin Şahin played for İzmir BB SK before she moved to Üsküdar Belediyespor. After one season with Muratpaşa Bld. SK in Antalya, she was transferred by Kastamonu Belediyespor for the 2014–15 season. In June 2015, she returned to her former club Muratpaşa Bld. SK signing a one-year contract with plus-one-year option.

National team

She played for Turkey at the 2013 Mediterranean Games, 2014 European Championship qualification and 2015 World Championship – European qualification matches. Currently, she is taking part at the 2016 European Championship qualification matches.

References

External links

1988 births
Sportspeople from Ankara
Turkish female handball players
İzmir Büyükşehir Belediyespor handball players
Üsküdar Belediyespor players
Muratpaşa Bld. SK (women's handball) players
Living people
Turkey women's national handball players
Mediterranean Games silver medalists for Turkey
Competitors at the 2009 Mediterranean Games
Competitors at the 2018 Mediterranean Games
Mediterranean Games medalists in handball
Competitors at the 2022 Mediterranean Games
21st-century Turkish sportswomen